Saint-Chamant may refer to the following places in France:

Saint-Chamant, Cantal, a commune in the department of Cantal
Saint-Chamant, Corrèze, a commune in the department of Corrèze